John Witherspoon College is a  non-denominational Christian liberal arts college in Rapid City, South Dakota. The college was founded in 2012 and named after the pastor, scholar and American Founding Father John Witherspoon. The college was created to serve both a local need for Christian higher education in the Black Hills and the broader interest for classic liberal-arts education in America.

History
In 2004, the Black Hills Bible Institute was founded by members of South Canyon Baptist Church in Rapid City, South Dakota. Its chief instigator was Dr. C. Richard Wells, a member of the founding faculty of Beeson Divinity School, former President of Criswell College, and the Pastor of South Canyon Baptist Church from 2004 to 2009. The purpose of the institute was to offer affordable, academic theological training in the Black Hills to students, including those transferred from other conforming Christian colleges. In 2009, Dr. Wells accepted an offer to be the Dean of Chapel at Union University in Jackson, Tennessee and in 2011 returned to Rapid City to restructure the Black Hills Bible Institute into John Witherspoon College, where he was president until 2019.

On August 21, 2012, John Witherspoon College began its first classes. The Inaugural Convocation took place on the campus on September 6 with city mayor Sam Kooiker as the keynote speaker. US Senator John Thune was the keynote speaker of the annual ScholarShare Banquet the following spring.

For the tax year of 2012, the college had an income of about $255,000.

Accreditation
In fall 2014, the college announced that it had applicant status with the Transnational Association of Christian Colleges and Schools (TRACS), a Christian accrediting body recognized by the US Department of Education. The college achieved accredited status in April 2017.

Campus
The campus of John Witherspoon College is located at 4021 Range Road, collocated with BigHorn Canyon Community Church. This land was purchased by Black Hills Bible School in 1956 out of the 1200-acre holdings of the Rapid City Indian School.  It was formerly the Abiding Word Lutheran Church. The college library and faculty offices are located in the Christ Church Annex at 414 S. Canyon Road.

The college offers courses inside the Rapid City Juvenile Services Center for incarcerated youth who want to begin working on college degrees while serving time.

Cultural events
John Witherspoon College also hosts cultural events, bringing performers such as Michael Card and Ballet Magnificat! to perform in Rapid City.

References

Union University
Private universities and colleges in South Dakota
Educational institutions established in 2004
2004 establishments in South Dakota
Education in Rapid City, South Dakota